Senavati (pronounced sēnāvati) is a ragam in Carnatic music (musical scale of South Indian classical music). It is the 7th melakarta rāgam (parent scale) in the 72 melakarta rāgam system of Carnatic music. It is called Senāgrani in Muthuswami Dikshitar school of Carnatic music.

Structure and Lakshana

It is the 1st rāgam in the 2nd chakra Netra. The mnemonic name is Netra-Pa. The mnemonic phrase is sa ra gi ma pa dha na. Its  structure (ascending and descending scale) is as follows (see swaras in Carnatic music for details on below notation and terms):
: 
: 

The swaras in this rāgam are shuddha rishabham, sadharana gandharam, shuddha madhyamam, shuddha dhaivatham and shuddha nishadham. As it is a melakarta rāgam, by definition it is a sampoorna rāgam (has all seven notes in ascending and descending scale). It is the shuddha madhyamam equivalent of Gavambhodi, which is the 43rd melakarta scale..

Asampurna Melakarta 
Senāgrani is the 7th Melakarta in the original list compiled by Venkatamakhin. The notes used in the scale are the same, but the ascending scale and descending scales are with vakra prayoga (zig-zag order in usage of notes).
: 
:

Janya rāgams 
Senavati has a few minor janya rāgams (derived scales) associated with it. See List of janya rāgams for rāgams associated with Senavati.

Compositions
Jalamela Raghupathe by Dr. M. Balamuralikrishna is set to Senavati raga.
Gnanambike palayamam by Muthuswami Dikshitar is set to Senāgrani raga.

Related rāgams
This section covers the theoretical and scientific aspect of this rāgam.

Senavati's notes when shifted using Graha bhedam, yields 2 melakarta rāgams, namely, Latangi and Sooryakantam. Graha bhedam is the step taken in keeping the relative note frequencies same, while shifting the shadjam to the next note in the rāgam. For further details and an illustration refer Graha bhedam on Sooryakantam.

Notes

References

Melakarta ragas